Canyon Falls is an unincorporated community in Lee County, Kentucky, United States.

A post office was established in 1909 at Canyon Falls. The community was named for a local canyon and waterfall; the latter was destroyed with dynamite for the construction of a road.

References

Unincorporated communities in Lee County, Kentucky
Unincorporated communities in Kentucky